Morro Negro is a hill located near the east coast of the island of Boa Vista, Cape Verde. Its elevation is 156 m. The nearest village is Cabeça dos Tarrafes, 5.5 km to the northwest.

Turtle Nature Reserve
The hill forms a part of the Turtle Nature Reserve (Portuguese: Reserva Natural Tartaruga), which covers 14.39 km2 of land area and 134.36 km2 of marine area. The reserve protects the beaches as nesting areas for its turtle population, and its wetlands and salty lands for birds.

Lighthouse

There is a lighthouse on the hill. The lighthouse was built around 1930. It is 12 meters tall and its focal height is 163 meters.

See also
List of lighthouses in Cape Verde
List of mountains in Cape Verde

References

Negro
Geography of Boa Vista, Cape Verde
Lighthouses in Cape Verde